Rita Patel is a former One Day International cricketer who represented India. She played in one One Day International match, against New Zealand in 1977.

References

Living people
India women One Day International cricketers
Indian women cricketers
Year of birth missing (living people)